Cambo BV is a manufacturer of high quality, mainly large format cameras based in Kampen, the Netherlands, and has the distinction of being the first studio camera manufacturer to produce an all-metal large format camera.

History

The company was founded by Roelof Bok in 1945 in Hengelo, the Netherlands.
At the time the company was called Technica Hengelo. Trying to export the first produced camera 'Super Technica'  a confusion with Linhof Technica made it necessary to rethink the company's name to Cambo (CAMera BOk)
The company moved to Kampen in 1965.
In 1968, cambo obtained worldwide success by developing the multishot camera. This camera fitted with four lenses and hence is able to take four pictures at a time.
Since several years Cambo has expanded their product range into the market for Video supports.

Current large format cameras

 Wide RS
The WRS has been designed for digital photography with high-end digital backs and is the camera of choice for architecture, landscape and automotive photography.
It can be used with the complete line of modern Rodenstock Digaron-S and Digaron-W lenses and with a vast choice of existing Schneider Digitar lenses.

 Ultima
 Actus
 X2-pro
 SC.2
 45 Repro-D

Sources
Cambo website
Camera Beurs, issue winter/spring 1991/92

External links
Cambo

Cameras
Photography companies of the Netherlands
Companies based in Overijssel
Companies established in 1945
Dutch brands